Waleed F. Zuaiter (born January 16, 1971) is an Arab-American actor and producer who has performed in on-stage productions in Washington, D.C.; Berkeley, California; and New York City, as well as several film and television productions. He lives in Los Angeles, California. He is the producer and co-star of Omar (2013), which was nominated for an Oscar at the 86th Academy Awards for Best Foreign Language Film.

Early life and education
Zuaiter, an American with Palestinian ancestry, born in 1971 in Sacramento, California, but grew up in Kuwait. He returned to the United States to earn his degree in philosophy and theatre at George Washington University, in Washington, D.C..

Career
Zuaiter began his acting career with several productions in Washington, before relocating to New York City.

On the New York stage, he received critical acclaim for his portrayal of a former Iraqi translator for the U.S. military, in George Packer's Betrayed. He also has starred in David Greig's The American Pilot at the Manhattan Theatre Club, Tony Kushner's Homebody/Kabul, Ilan Hatsor's Masked, Eliam Kraiem's Sixteen Wounded, and Victoria Brittain and Gillian Slovo's Guantanamo: Honor Bound to Defend Freedom. He also performed alongside Meryl Streep and Kevin Kline in Mother Courage at the Public Theater.

Zuaiter is also the producer of the annual New York Arab-American Comedy Festival and a member of the Arab-American theater collective NIBRAS.

Zuaiter's film and television productions include the HBO/BBC miniseries House of Saddam, Sex and the City 2 and The Men Who Stare at Goats, in which he played the role of Mahmud Daash. Recently, he completed filming the suspense-thriller Elevator, directed by Stig Svendsen, in which he plays a man trapped in a Wall Street elevator with several people, one of whom has a bomb.

Most recently Waleed produced and starred in Omar, a gripping thriller written and directed by Golden Globe winner and Oscar nominee Hany Abu-Assad (Paradise Now). The film was selected as the Palestinian entry for the Best Foreign Language Film at the 86th Academy Awards, and was nominated for an Academy Award. It also won Best Feature Film at the 2013 Asian Pacific Screen Awards.

He also was featured in an NBC Universal Pilot written by Tom Fontana and Barry Levinson and directed by Spike Lee, starring Bobby Cannavale. Alongside Bobby Cannavale, Waleed's son, Laith Zuaiter, was featured in the pilot. Waleed Zuaiter starred in London Has Fallen as Kamran Barkawi, Aamir Barkawi's son and henchman and second in command of a terrorist strike.

He starred as the recurring character Samir Abboud in the Netflix adaptation of the novel Altered Carbon. Zuaiter starred in Billionaire Boys Club as The Persian, Hedayat Eslaminia and Izzy’s Father. In 2019, Waleed Zuaiter starred in Netflix limited series The Spy, as the Syrian Colonel Amin al-Hafiz.

In 2020, he played the role of a former Iraqi police officer collaborating with US forces while trying to find his missing daughter in the series Baghdad Central. The role earned him a leading actor nomination in the 2021 British Academy Television Awards.

In 2021, he starred as Hassan Asfour, senior Palestinian Liberation Organization negotiator, in the HBO film Oslo about the negotiations that led to the Oslo I Accord.

As of October 2022, Zuaiter is co-starring as Koba, a Georgian assassin and crime boss, in the second season of Gangs of London, a London crime drama series airing on Sky Atlantic in the UK and Germany, and on AMC in the US.

Filmography

Film

Television

References

External links
Arab American News
 Profile of Waleed Zuaiter in The National
 Profile of Waleed Zuaiter at the Institute for Middle East Understanding
 New York Times review of the play Abandoned
 Article about Waleed Zuaiter in TalkMoviesWorld.com

1971 births
Living people
American people of Palestinian descent
American male actors
Columbian College of Arts and Sciences alumni